Hadronector is a prehistoric lobe-finned fish which lived during the Carboniferous period (Mississippian epoch (Serpukhovian stage), about 318 to 326 million years ago) of Montana, North America. Hadronector belongs to the group of coelacanth fishes and it is the type genus in the family of Hadronectoridae.

References 

Hadronectoridae
Prehistoric lobe-finned fish genera
Carboniferous bony fish
Mississippian fish of North America